Ethmia nigrimaculata is a moth in the family Depressariidae. It is found in China (Shansi), Ukraine, Russia (Central Tuva and the southern Chita Province) and probably Mongolia.

References

Moths described in 1967
nigrimaculata